Cryptomastix is a genus of air-breathing land snails, terrestrial pulmonate gastropod mollusks in the family Polygyridae.

These snails cannot be differentiated from related polygyrids solely on the basis of their shell characters. Instead, the details of the male anatomy must be examined.

Distribution
This genus of snails is restricted to the northwestern United States, and to adjacent areas of British Columbia, Canada.

Species 
This genus includes the following species:

Cryptomastix devia (Gould, 1846); Puget Oregonian
Cryptomastix germana (Gould, 1851); Pygmy Oregonian
Cryptomastix germana vancouverinsulae (Pilsbry and Cooke, 1922)
Cryptomastix harfordiana (W. G. Binney; 1886); Salmon Oregonian
Cryptomastix hendersoni (Pilsbry, 1928); Columbia Oregonian
Cryptomastix magnidentata (Pilsbry, 1940); Mission Creek Oregonian
Cryptomastix mullani (Bland and J. G. Cooper, 1861); Coeur d'Alene Oregonian
Cryptomastix mullani blandi (Hemphill, 1892)
Cryptomastix mullani clappi (Hemphill, 1897)
Cryptomastix mullani hemphilli (W. G. Binney, 1886)
Cryptomastix mullani latilabris (Pilsbry, 1940)
Cryptomastix mullani olneyae (Pilsbry, 1891)
Cryptomastix mullani tuckeri (Pilsbry and Henderson, 1930)
Cryptomastix sanburni (W. G. Binney, 1886); Kingston Oregonian

References

Polygyridae
Taxonomy articles created by Polbot